The 2009 Newfoundland and Labrador Scotties Tournament of Hearts, Newfoundland and Labrador's women's provincial curling championship, will be held January 21-25 at the Bally Haly Golf and Curling Club in St. John's. The winner represents team Newfoundland and Labrador at the 2009 Scotties Tournament of Hearts in Victoria, British Columbia.

Teams

Standings

Results

January 21
Strong 6-3 Hannan
Jewer 10-9 Devereaux
Nichols 8-2 Pinsent
Jewer 8-2 Miller
Strong 7-6 Nichols
Pinsent 7-4 Devereaux

January 22
Devereaux 6-4 Nichols
Miller 6-5 Hannan  
Strong 7-3 Pinsent   
Pinsent 9-1 Jewer 
Devereaux 5-3 Miller
Hannan 10-9 Nichols

January 23
Miller 8-3 Pinsent
Jewer 8-6 Hannan
Strong 9-5 Devereaux  
Strong 7-6 Miller
Jewer 5-4 Nichols   
Pinsent 6-3 Hannan

January 24
Hannan 7-6 Devereaux    
Strong 9-4 Jewer
Nichols 10-3 Miller

Playoffs
Semi-final, January 24; Final(s) on January 25

Strong must be beaten twice.

Semi-final

Final

External links
Official site

Newfoundland and Labrador
Sport in St. John's, Newfoundland and Labrador
Curling in Newfoundland and Labrador